Maurice Palgen (13 May 1893 – 23 February 1951) was a Luxembourgian gymnast who competed in the 1912 Summer Olympics. He was born in Luxembourg City. In 1912 he was a member of the Luxembourgian team which finished fifth in the team, free system event.

References

External links
 Maurice Palgen's profile at Sports Reference.com

1893 births
1951 deaths
Luxembourgian male artistic gymnasts
Olympic gymnasts of Luxembourg
Gymnasts at the 1912 Summer Olympics